The Synchronized swimming competition at the 2006 Central American and Caribbean Games was held in Cartagena, Colombia. The tournament was scheduled to be held from 15 to 30 July 2006.

Medal summary

Medal table

References

 

2006 Central American and Caribbean Games